An Echtra or Echtrae (pl. Echtrai),  is a type of pre-Christian Old Irish literature about a hero's adventures in the Otherworld or with otherworldly beings.

Definition and etymology
In Irish literature Echtrae and Immram are tales of voyages to an Otherworld. In general the "Echtrae" are set in a pagan context. In contrast the Immram, though containing mythological story elements, are set in post-pagan Ireland, and the main protagonist is Christian, and the journey is usually by sea.

A point of contention in absolute definition exists in the case of "Immram Brain maic Febail". Despite the naming this tale is considered to form part of the Echtrae milieu, and may have been named as an Immram due to a conflation of Bran (Brain) and St. Brendan.

Generally, echtra was the Old Irish word for "adventure" (literally meaning an "outing".), as well as a cognate for the Latin extra, The modern and middle  Irish language word is eachtra.

The Dictionary of the Irish Language notes alternative usage meanings in addition to the primary "expedition, voyage, journey" - these include "a warlike expedition", and the more general "tale", or "history".

Description

Though Echtrai often involve a journey to an otherworld, the exact destination or journey can vary - voyages take place by sea in Echtrae Conli; in a journey underneath a lake in Echtrae Laegairi; or into a fairy mound (Sidhe) in Echtrae Nerai; alternatively the story may not include such a journey but instead involve an interaction with otherworldly beings : in Echtrae Nerai, set on Samhain, the hero Nera sees prophetic visions whilst in the presence of a hanged man; whilst in Echtra Mac nEchach Muid-medóin, the hero Níall gains the sovereignty of Ireland by kissing a hag guarding a well.

Works
Echtra Condla (or Echtrae Chonnlai, adventure of Conle)
Echtrae Cormaic maic Airt i Tir Tairngiri
Echtrae Laegairi maic Crimthann
Echtrae Nerai (aka Táin Bó Aingen)
Ectra Airt maic Cuinn
Echtrae mac nEchach Mugmedoin

Tales not titled Echtra, but considered part of milieu
Baile in Scáil (The Phantom's Frenzy)
The Five Lugaids
Tochmarc Emire
Serglige Con Chulainn
Siaburcharpat Con Culaind 
Imram Bran

Lost tales
Echtrae Con Culainn
Echtrae Chrimthaind Nia Nair
Echtrae Fiamain
Echtrae Con Roi
Echtrae Chonaill
Echtrae Chonchobair
Echtrae Machae ingine Aeda Ruaid
Echtrae Nechtain maic Alfroinn
Echtrae Ailchm d maic Amalgaid
Echtrae Find i nDerc Ferna
Echtrae Aedain maic Gabrain
Echtrae Mael Uma maic Baitain
Echtrae Mongain maic Fiachna
Echtrae Fergussa maic Leti
Echtrae Oengusae maic Fergusa Finn
Echtrae Chuinn Chetchathaig
Echtrae Muirquertoig maic hErco

There are also visits to the otherworld undertaken by the hero Cuchulainn, including : Forfess Fer Fálgae, Fled Bricrenn ocus Loinges mac nDuil Dermait, and Compert Con Culainn

References

Sources

Early Irish literature
Irish mythology
Voyagers in Celtic mythology
Medieval literature